Trichromia viola is a moth in the family Erebidae. It was described by Paul Dognin in 1909. It is found in French Guiana and Venezuela.

References

Moths described in 1909
viola